"Tease Me" is a song by American R&B/pop music trio 3T, released in 1996 as the second single from their debut album, Brotherhood (1995). The original idea of the song belongs to Taryll Jackson, who co-wrote the lyrics.

Critical reception
Larry Flick from Billboard described the song as a "seductive rhythm ballad". He noted that "the lyrics are suave and delivered with a youthful soul that will keep the kids happy, while appealing to older pop listeners."

Official versions
 "Tease Me" (Album Version) - 5:28
 "Tease Me" (Single Edit) - 4:25
 "Tease Me" (Sex O'Clock Club Mix) - 4:52
 "Tease Me" (Todd Terry's Tease Club Mix) - 6:49
 "Tease Me" (Todd Terry's TNT Tease Dub) - 6:11
 "Tease Me" (Acapella) - 4:40

Charts

References

External links
Music video on YouTube

1995 songs
1996 singles
3T songs
Epic Records singles